A coiled coil is a structural motif in proteins in which 2–7 alpha-helices are coiled together like the strands of a rope. (Dimers and trimers are the most common types.) Many coiled coil-type proteins are involved in important biological functions, such as the regulation of gene expression — e.g., transcription factors. Notable examples are the oncoproteins c-Fos and c-Jun, as well as the muscle protein tropomyosin.

Discovery

The possibility of coiled coils for α-keratin was initially somewhat controversial. Linus Pauling and Francis Crick independently came to the conclusion that this was possible at about the same time. In the summer of 1952, Pauling visited the laboratory in England where Crick worked. Pauling and Crick met and spoke about various topics; at one point, Crick asked whether Pauling had considered "coiled coils" (Crick came up with the term), to which Pauling said he had. Upon returning to the United States, Pauling resumed research on the topic. He concluded that coiled coils exist, and submitted a lengthy manuscript to the journal Nature in October. Pauling's son Peter Pauling worked at the same lab as Crick, and mentioned the report to him. Crick believed that Pauling had stolen his idea, and submitted a shorter note to Nature a few days after Pauling's manuscript arrived. Eventually, after some controversy and frequent correspondences, Crick's lab declared that the idea had been reached independently by both researchers, and that no intellectual theft had occurred.  In his note (which was published first due to its shorter length), Crick proposed the Coiled Coil and as well as mathematical methods for determining their structure. Remarkably, this was soon after the structure of the alpha helix was suggested in 1951 by Linus Pauling and coworkers. These studies were published in the absence of knowledge of a keratin sequence. The first keratin sequences were determined by Hanukoglu and Fuchs in 1982.

Based on sequence and secondary structure prediction analyses identified the coiled-coil domains of keratins. These models have been confirmed by structural analyses of coiled-coil domains of keratins.

Molecular structure

Coiled coils usually contain a repeated pattern, hxxhcxc, of hydrophobic (h) and charged (c) amino-acid residues, referred to as a heptad repeat.
The positions in the heptad repeat are usually labeled abcdefg, where a and d are the hydrophobic positions, often being occupied by isoleucine, leucine, or valine. Folding a sequence with this repeating pattern into an alpha-helical secondary structure causes the hydrophobic residues to be presented as a 'stripe' that coils gently around the helix in left-handed fashion, forming an amphipathic structure. The most favorable way for two such helices to arrange themselves in the water-filled environment of the cytoplasm is to wrap the hydrophobic strands against each other sandwiched between the hydrophilic amino acids. Thus, it is the burial of hydrophobic surfaces that provides the thermodynamic driving force for the oligomerization. The packing in a coiled-coil interface is exceptionally tight, with almost complete van der Waals contact between the side-chains of the a and d residues. This tight packing was originally predicted by Francis Crick in 1952 and is referred to as Knobs into holes packing.

The α-helices may be parallel or anti-parallel, and usually adopt a left-handed super-coil (Figure 1).  Although disfavored, a few right-handed coiled coils have also been observed in nature and in designed proteins.

Biological roles

Role in HIV infection

Viral entry into CD4-positive cells commences when three subunits of a glycoprotein 120 (gp120) bind to CD4 receptor and a coreceptor. Glycoprotein gp120 is closely associated to a trimer of gp41 via van der Waals interactions. Upon binding of gp120 to the CD4 receptor and coreceptor, a number of conformational changes in the structure leads to the dissociation of gp120 and to the exposure of gp41 and at the same time to the anchoring of the gp41 N-terminal fusion peptide sequence into the host cell. A spring-loaded mechanism is responsible for bringing the viral and cell membranes in close enough proximity that they will fuse. The origin of the spring-loaded mechanism lies within the exposed gp41, which contains two consecutive heptad repeats (HR1 and HR2) following the fusion peptide at the N terminus of the protein. HR1 forms a parallel, trimeric coiled coil onto which HR2 region coils, forming the trimer-of-hairpins (or six-helix bundle) structure, thereby facilitating membrane fusion through bringing the membranes close to each other. The virus then enters the cell and begins its replication.  Recently, inhibitors derived from HR2 such as Fuzeon (DP178, T-20) bind to the HR1 region on gp41 have been developed. However, peptides derived from HR1 have little viral inhibition efficacy due to the propensity for these peptides to aggregate in solution. Chimeras of these HR1-derived peptides with GCN4 leucine zippers have been developed and have shown to be more active than Fuzeon, but these have not entered the clinic yet.

As oligomerization tags
Because of their specific interaction coiled coils can be used as a "tags" to stabilize or enforce a specific oligomerization state. A coiled coil interaction has been observed to drive the oligomerization of the BBS2 and BBS7 subunits of the BBSome.

Design
The general problem of deciding on the folded structure of a protein when given the amino acid sequence (the so-called protein folding problem) has only been solved partially.  However, the coiled coil is one of a relatively small number of folding motifs for which the relationships between the sequence and the final folded structure are comparatively well understood. Harbury et al. performed a landmark study using an archetypal coiled coil, GCN4, in which rules that govern the way that peptide sequence affects the oligomeric state (that is, the number of alpha-helices in the final assembly) were established. The GCN4 coiled coil is a 31-amino-acid (which equates to just over four heptads) parallel, dimeric (i.e., consisting of two alpha-helices) coiled coil and has a repeated isoleucine (or I, in single-letter code) and leucine (L) at the a and d positions, respectively, and forms a dimeric coiled coil. When the amino acids in the a and d positions were changed from I at a and L at d to I at a and I at d, a trimeric (three alpha-helices) coiled coil was formed. Furthermore, switching the positions of L to a and I to d resulted in the formation of a tetrameric (four alpha-helices) coiled coil. These represent a set of rules for the determination of coiled coil oligomeric states and allows scientists to effectively "dial-in" the oligomerization behavior. Another aspect of coiled coil assembly that is relatively well understood, at least in the case of dimeric coiled coils, is that placing a polar residue (in particular asparagine, N) at opposing a positions forces parallel assembly of the coiled coil. This effect is due to a self-complementary hydrogen bonding between these residues, which would go unsatisfied if an N were paired with, for instance, an L on the opposing helix.

It was recently demonstrated by Peacock, Pikramenou and co-workers that coiled coils may be self-assembled using lanthanide(III) ions as a template, thus producing novel imaging agents.

References

Further reading

External links 
 Coiled-coil domains of keratins

Coiled-coil related software

Prediction, detection, and visualization 
 
 
 Paircoil2 / Paircoil
 bCIPA Estimates Tm values for coiled coil pairs
 bCIPA library screen Screens a library of sequences against a single defined target and estimates Tm values for all coiled coils pairs.
 bCIPA Interactome Screen Screens all interactions between a selection of defined sequences and estimates Tm values for all coiled coil pairs.
 STRAP contains an algorithm to predict coiled-coils from AA-sequences.
 PrOCoil predicts the oligomerization of coiled coil proteins and visualizes the contribution of each individual amino acid to the overall oligomeric tendency.
 DrawCoil creates helical wheel diagrams for coiled coils of any oligomerization state and orientation.

Databases 
 Spiricoil uses protein domain annotation to predict coiled coil presence and oligormeric state for all completely sequenced organisms
 CC+ is a relational database of coiled coils found in the PDB
 SUPERFAMILY protein domain annotation for all completely sequenced organisms based on the expertly curated SCOP coiled coil class

Protein folds